Monte Cianea is a  mountain of the Ligurian Prealps, in Italy.

Geography 
The mountain belongs to the Ligurian Alps and is located in the province of Cuneo (Piedmont), close to the border with Liguria. It's located on the main chain of the Alps and is the tripoint where the drainage divides  between Tanaro, Bormida and Neva valleys meet. In the SOIUSA (International Standardized Mountain Subdivision of the Alps) it belongs to the Ligurian Prealps and, within them, to Monte Carmo group and Costiera del Monte Carmo subgroup (SOIUSA code:I/A-1.I-A.2.b).

Geology 
The mountain is mainly made of granite rocks, which are crossed by a gneiss belt rich in minerals of the feldspar group.

History 

The area around Monte Cianea was involved in Napoleon's Italian campaign; in 1795 the Piedmontese army built there a stronghold. The area saw then violent fights because of its strategic relevance, given access to Tanaro valley and thus to the Po plain.

Access to the summit 

The monte Cianea can be easily reached by footpath starting from different places. The route from Colle del Quazzo crosses the Colla Bassa pass, while from Colle San Bernardo the way is shorter and encircles on the Neva valley side of the neighboring (and steeper) Bric dello Schiavo. The southern slopes of Monte Cianea are crossed by the Alta Via dei Monti Liguri, in its stage linking Colle San Bernardo with Colle Scravaion.

References

Bibliography

Maps

External links 
 
 

One-thousanders of Italy
Mountains of Piedmont
Mountains of the Ligurian Alps
Province of Cuneo